Charles Denroche (17 December 1921 – 14 August 2004) was an Irish sprinter. He competed in the men's 4 × 400 metres relay at the 1948 Summer Olympics.

References

1921 births
2004 deaths
Athletes (track and field) at the 1948 Summer Olympics
Irish male sprinters
Olympic athletes of Ireland
Place of birth missing